Udit Raj (born 1 January 1958) is an Indian politician and member of Indian National Congress. He was a Member of Parliament between 2014 and 2019 in the Lok Sabha, representing the  North West Delhi as a member of Bharatiya Janata Party. Raj is also the National Chairman of the All India Confederation of SC/ST Organizations.

Life and education 
Raj was born on 1 January 1958 in Ramnagar, Uttar Pradesh to Kallan and Sukhdei. He completed Master of Arts from Osmaniya University 1988 and received an honorary doctorate in humanities from Bible College and Seminary Kota, Rajasthan in 2003. He married Seem Raj on 24 March 1990, with whom he has a son and a daughter. Raj was selected for the Indian Revenue Service in 1988 and served as the Deputy Commissioner, Joint Commissioner and Additional Commissioner of Income Tax at New Delhi. On 24 November 2003, he resigned from government service and formed the Indian Justice Party. He is also a businessperson and a consultant, apart from being a politician and a social worker.

Political career 
Raj joined the BJP on 23 February 2014. In the past he had opposed the BJP, but after getting a BJP ticket for Lok Sabha, he said that it was more sympathetic to the SC and ST communities and declared that the "Dalits have a brighter future in BJP". On being denied a ticket to contest  the 2019 Indian general election, Raj quit the BJP and joined the Congress, saying that the BJP "is against the interests of Dalits".

Raj converted from Hinduism to Buddhism in 2001.

References

1958 births
India MPs 2014–2019
University of Allahabad alumni
Bharatiya Janata Party politicians from Delhi
Indian civil rights activists
Indian caste leaders
Indian Revenue Service officers
Living people
Lok Sabha members from Delhi
People from Allahabad district
People from North West Delhi district
Dalit politicians
Converts to Buddhism from Hinduism
Indian Buddhists
21st-century Buddhists
Indian former Hindus
Indian National Congress politicians